The 1972 Ole Miss Rebels football team represented the University of Mississippi during the 1972 NCAA University Division football season. The Rebels were led by second-year head coach Billy Kinard and played their home games at Hemingway Stadium in Oxford, Mississippi and Mississippi Veterans Memorial Stadium in Jackson. They competed as members of the Southeastern Conference, finishing tied for seventh with a record of 5–5 (2–5 SEC).

Ole Miss fielded its first integrated varsity football team in 1972, as did SEC rival LSU and Brigham Young. This was ten years after James Meredith became the first African-American to attend the university. 

This was the first of 11 consecutive seasons in which the Rebels did not play in a bowl.

Schedule

Roster

Season summary

at LSU

References

Ole Miss
Ole Miss Rebels football seasons
Ole Miss Rebels football